Meri Jung is a 1985 Indian Hindi-language legal drama film produced by N. N. Sippy and directed by Subhash Ghai. The film stars Nutan, Anil Kapoor, Meenakshi Seshadri, Amrish Puri, Javed Jaffrey (in his debut film), A. K. Hangal, Iftekhar, Khushbu and Parikshit Sahni. The film's music was by Laxmikant-Pyarelal and lyrics were by Anand Bakshi. The film was a huge box office success and was critically acclaimed. It was a breakthrough performance for Anil Kapoor and put him into the big league. Kapoor and Puri's  performance in the film are considered to be one of their best and he received his first Filmfare Award nomination; under the Best Actor Category as well as Puri also won Best supporting actor.  The film was also nominated under the Best Film category. One of the highest grossing movie of its decade, Meri Jung is regarded as one of the greatest Bollywood movies ever made. Many scenes have been repeatedly satirized in future movies and shows, a testament to its legacy. A remake was discussed but no plans materialized.

Plot 
The story begins with a happy lower-middle-class family – Arun Verma (Anil Kapoor) an 8-year-old boy, his sister Komal Verma (Khushbu) a 5-year-old girl, his mother (Nutan) and his father (Girish Karnad) – living a peaceful life. Arun's parents teach their children through the famous title song "Zindagi Har Kadam Ek Nayi Jung Hai, Jeet Jayenge Hum, Jeet Jayenge Hum Tu Agar Sang Hai" which means that life is full of challenges at every step and still we will overcome all these if we are together.

Arun's father is trapped in a murder case. A famous criminal lawyer G . D Thakral (Amrish Puri) proves him guilty, and he is sentenced to be hanged by the court. Pleas by Arun's mother fail to convince Thakral to be truthful and spare her husband. Thakral asks her to give evidence for his innocence, to which she sadly quotes, "Jiske paas koi sabut, koi gavanh nahi hote kya wo nirdosh nahin hote" ("one who does not have any proof or witness of innocence, are they not innocent?"). Thakral was determined to let her husband hang. He is hanged as per the court's decision. His mother becomes mentally unstable from shock and is sent to a mental institution. Later Advocate Gupta (A. K. Hangal), the lawyer who defended Arun's father, finds out that Thakral had known all along that he was innocent, but only wanted him to be hanged. Arun finds out that Thakral abused the law.

Arun's house and all his property are auctioned off by the court. Arun and his sister are not offered help. He grows up with the seeds of revenge in his heart. He becomes a successful defence lawyer and keenly follows every case of Thakral so that some day he can stand up in court against the unbeaten Thakral and beat him.

One day Geeta Srivatsav (Meenakshi) comes to him and asks him to fight the case of her sister, Dr. Asha Mathur (Bina), who is accused of killing a patient on duty with her medicine, which she gave from her purse. Arun refuses saying that if she can produce even a piece of evidence of her sister being innocent he will fight for her. Geeta replies coincidentally the same sentence "Jiske paas koi sabut, koi gavanh nahi hote kya wo nirdosh nahin hote." Arun is instantly reminded of his mother's pleadings before Thakral. Geeta storms out of his office, but Arun is convinced to take the case. He meets Asha Mathur in police custody. He learns from her that on that fateful night she got a call from her ward assistant that her patient is in the ICU and needs her. She stops on the way (due to a traffic jam), and she impatiently moves out of her car to ask the reason. Meanwhile, somebody replaces the medicine bottle with the look-alike bottle of poison from her purse. On arrival in the hospital, she gives the liquid from that bottle to stabilise the patient. This resulted in the patient's death.

It is shown that Asha Mathur's husband, Dr. Dinesh Mathur (Parikshit Sahni), had gone to meet Thakral and had asked him to fight his wife's case. Thakral says no, claiming he is very busy at the moment, but later tells his assistant that there is no way that this case could be won. Arun meets Dinesh Mathur and informs him that he will fight the case. He asked him about the nature of poison and for how long a person can sustain the poison; he learns that poison might result in death within 2 to 15 minutes depending on the body's resistance.

The case begins with the prosecution lawyer recounting the events of that fateful day and telling that the medicine given to the patient was actually poison. Arun defends the case says that the patient did not die of this medicine. To prove himself right he drinks the medicine in court and refutes the claim. The court declares Geeta's sister not guilty. Just after the judgement, Dr. Mathur rushes Arun to hospital. It is revealed that the medicine contained poison, and Arun is saved in the nick of time.

Geeta calls him on a beach to appreciate his efforts and kindness at the canteen. They fall in love. Thakral's son Vikram Thakral (Javed Jaffrey), a spoiled brat, not knowing anything about Arun, teases Geeta, which irritates the couple. Soon things take an ugly turn and Arun beats up Vikram.

Dr. Mathur wants to appreciate and compensate Arun for the risky effort he took to save his wife. He calls him for a get-together in his mansion. Dr. Mathur gives Arun a blank cheque. Arun rejects the offers politely and says he did for his self-satisfaction. He then finds the same piano with the sticker of Bhagwat Geeta of Krishna which his father used to play and was auctioned. His memories are refreshed again and with the emotional request he tells Dr. Mathur that this piano is very significant to him and asks for it. Dr. Mathur very happily gives him the piano.

One day at Arun's home, Mr. Mathur sees a photo of the former's mother hanging on the wall. He immediately recognises the face with the patient he was handling for mental disorders. Arun and his sister request them to take them to her. In the mental hospital they see their mother. Her memories had stopped on the day of the incident; she feels that their children are eight and five, staying with father. Arun brings her mother to his house and tries to make her come back to normal; she regains her memory on hearing the song "Zindagi Har Kadam..."

Meanwhile, Vikram wants to exact revenge on Arun and devises a plan to trap Komal who studies in the same college. He tries to impress her by his charms, dancing skills, and ways of flattering people. The plan works. Komal falls for him and he convinces her to run away with him (so that he can publicly defame Arun by leaving his sister). At the planned moment, one of Vikram's ex-girlfriends shows up and tells Komal of Vikram's evil intentions. In the ensuing argument, Vikram murders his girlfriend which is witnessed by Dr. Mathur's family.

Arun had been waiting for this moment to take revenge on Thakral. He steps in as the prosecutor against Thakral who is defending his son. The case moves to and fro and, in the end, Arun has the upper hand. Thakral kidnaps Arun's mother and attempts to blackmail him. Arun goes to save his mother and is beaten up by Thakral's goons near a Camp-Cola store. Even though injured, Arun fights back. In an attempt to shoot Arun, Thakral shoots his friend's son and is jailed. He is unsuccessful in saving his son, who is given the death penalty. Thakral becomes a mentally unstable person.

Arun and his family are reunited.

Cast

Soundtrack 
Music was composed by Laxmikant–Pyarelal and lyrics were penned by Anand Bakshi.

Remakes

Awards 
33rd Filmfare Awards:
Won
Best Supporting Actor – Amrish Puri
Best Supporting Actress – Nutan

Nominated
Best Film – N. N. Sippy
Best Director – Subhash Ghai
Best Actor – Anil Kapoor
Best Music Director – Laxmikant–Pyarelal
Best Lyricist – Anand Bakshi for "Zindagi Har Kadam"

References

External links 
 

1980s Hindi-language films
1985 films
Films directed by Subhash Ghai
Films scored by Laxmikant–Pyarelal
Hindi films remade in other languages
Indian courtroom films
Indian legal films